Leptochela is a genus of small shrimp from the family Pasiphaeidae. They are found in the Indo-Pacific region and the western Atlantic with an isolated species in Hawaii, they are absent from the eastern Atlantic Ocean and were absent from the eastern Pacific but specimens of a species widespread in the western Atlantic were collected from waters to the south of the tip of Baja California.  Two species, Leptochela aculeocaudata and Leptochela pugnax have invaded the eastern Mediterranean from the Red Sea through the Suez Canal and are thus classified as  Lessepsian migrants.

Species
The genus is split into two subgenera Leptochela and Proboloura and contains 15 currently recognised extant species.

 Leptochela (Leptochela) aculeocaudata Paul'son, 1875
 Leptochela (Leptochela) bermudensis Gurney, 1939
 Leptochela (Leptochela) chacei Hayashi, 1995
 Leptochela (Leptochela) crosnieri Hayashi, 1995
 Leptochela (Leptochela) gracilis Stimpson, 1860
 Leptochela (Leptochela) hawaiiensis Chace, 1976
 Leptochela (Leptochela) irrobusta Chace, 1976
 Leptochela (Leptochela) japonica Hayashi & Miyake, 1969
 Leptochela (Leptochela) papulata Chace, 1976
 Leptochela (Leptochela) pugnax de Man, 1916
 Leptochela (Leptochela) robusta Stimpson, 1860
 Leptochela (Leptochela) serratorbita Spence Bate, 1888
 Leptochela (Leptochela) sydniensis Dakin & Colefax, 1940
 Leptochela (Proboloura) carinata Ortmann, 1893
 Leptochela (Proboloura) soelae Hanamura, 1987

References

Decapods
Caridea
Decapod genera